Directo al corazón is the second album released by Mexican singer Luis Miguel and was released in 1982. The album sold around 900,000 copies in Mexico, and 115,000 copies in Argentina, where it was certified gold.

Track listing

Musical direction and arrangements by Peque Rossino except (*) Chucho Ferrer

References 

1982 albums
Luis Miguel albums
EMI Records albums
Spanish-language albums